Eastern States can refer to several locations:
 states located in the eastern United States, or, more narrowly, along its east coast
 Eastern states of Australia
 Eastern States Agency, a former administrative division of British India